Jean Akin Cunningham (born September 3, 1956) is an American performer, composer, songwriter, producer, writer and host of the video based web site The Composers Corner. She has toured with Lionel Richie, David Crosby of Crosby, Stills, Nash and Young and worked closely with Ike and Tina Turner. She is also the co-author and voice of the ongoing children's audio book series Los Diggities, written about three rescued dogs living in Los Angeles (first published in 2010). Seven cds of her music have been released on both domestic and international labels, as well as 2 performance DVDs.

Her music has also been heard worldwide from 1986 to present, as part of several high-profile product campaigns, with corporations such as Mitsubishi, Epson, Yamaha, Toshiba, and Chevron being among the many to utilize her original works.
Being anonymously responsible for a number of musical wakeup broadcasts to Space Shuttle astronauts from NASA's mission control during the late 1980s through the early 90s, earned Cunningham the nickname, "The Most Flown Unknown".

Known for her leadership in the struggle for gay rights (with particular emphasis on Christianity and its role in the LGBT community) Cunningham released a controversial Christian album, Come As You Are...To The Father, on the internet for free in 2000, making her the first recording artist to ever release an entire album/cd, including graphics and karaoke versions—downloadable for free—to the world via the internet.

In 2002, Cunningham was commissioned to write, record and perform a tribute song to the United States in commemoration of the September 11 attacks for the country of Aruba. The song, "We Will Remember" has since been used to commemorate Memorial Day, Veterans Day and Pearl Harbor Day memorials as well as 9-11, making it a 21st-century anthem.

In 2014, multi-media artist Steve Maloney commissioned Cunningham to write a song commemorating the Vietnam War veteran for Maloney's "Take Me Home Huey" project. 
The project involved taking a Huey helicopter that had been shot down in Vietnam and brought back to the U.S., rebuilding it (through a partnership with Lighthorse Legacy), then turning it into a colorful sculpture to facilitate dialogue for Vietnam veterans and raise awareness and funds for Post Traumatic Stress. In addition to the helicopter and song, a documentary film was made of the project, going by the same title of Take Me Home Huey, which won the 2016 Palm Springs Film Festival’s Mercedes Benz Audience Favorite award and has since been aired nationally on PBS in conjunction with the Ken Burns The Vietnam War series. In November 2017 the song earned Cunningham Congressional recognition from Congressman Mark Amodei of Nevada. The documentary also won an Emmy for Best Arts in 2018.

Cunningham was also the recipient of the 2016 For the Children Inspiration Award presented by Opera Arts & The Steinway Society of Riverside County, California in recognition for her work designing and implementing a curriculum of Ukulele Instruction for elementary school children of the Coachella Valley, California. Combining forces with the Steinway Society to develop approaches to teaching music in schools, Cunningham is still involved with educating the next generation of musicians.

Biography

Early life

Born in Los Angeles, Jeanie Cunningham was adopted into a military family at the age of 3 weeks, following an experimental surgery on her severely clubbed left foot that would hopefully make it possible for her to walk. It would be 2 more surgeries later in her childhood before she would be able to walk without a limp, but the early impressions of being physically challenged stayed with her throughout her life.

Jeanie and her brother Caleb (also adopted) bounced from city to city as children, following the marching orders of their father, an officer in the United States Marine Corps. Wearing a leg brace and walking with a pronounced limp, Jeanie had to endure the taunts of other school children with every move her family made. She attributes this childhood challenge as being a key component to developing her comedic humor and performance capabilities. The taunts of the children ended quickly once they discovered Jeanie's talents and she would often entertain them with original songs that either voiced dissent over faculty members or anti-war sentiments shared by youth in the turbulent 1960s.

She composed her first song at the age of eight, strumming the tune on a homemade cardboard and rubber-band guitar. At age eleven, she was given a series of I.Q. tests as well as musical aptitude tests. She scored relatively high in I.Q. (132), but even higher in music. Disregarding what was then determined as Jeanie's "prodigious musical talent", her parents didn't allow her formal music instruction and as a consequence, she never learned how to read or write music notation.

Despite the lack of formal musical training, Cunningham taught herself to play the ukulele, then guitar, then piano and other instruments. She attributes the "musical inconvenience" of not being able to read notation as being key to her developing her songwriting skills, noting that if she couldn't easily play someone else's music, she would create her own.

Her pursuit of a musical career took a front seat when, while as a boarding student attending The American School In Switzerland, a teenage Cunningham went AWOL (absent without leave) for 3 days to see Ike & Tina Turner perform in concert. Faced with 2 weeks suspension when she returned to school, she took it in stride because, as she later put it, "The night I saw Tina Turner, it was like a burning bush from God. I knew I was destined to meet her." (The school, in spite of Cunningham's lack of musical knowledge, later went on to present her with the annual Excellence in Music Award in 1975, and subsequently named her an "honored alumna" 35 years later as a result of her considerable achievements in music composition and performance). Following graduation in 1975, Cunningham returned to Los Angeles and hooked up with Ike & Tina Turner. A few years later, Turner's performance of one of Cunningham's co-written songs, "I Can Take A Little Bit Of Pain" on The Tonight Show, earned the newcomer her professional songwriting credentials.

Career
 
After touring internationally with the all-female band The Cherries, Cunningham began building her own recording studio, Resnik-One (named after astronaut Judith Resnik who died in the Challenger disaster), in Los Angeles. During this time, she also attended the American Academy of Dramatic Arts, developing her acting skills with the intention of one day performing in musical theatre. But the skills she had developed as a musician and composer ultimately won out and she soon found herself on the road with other acts. Between tours as a guitarist with Lionel Richie's band and as an opening act for David Crosby, Cunningham continued to hone her skills as a songwriter, including writing for high-profile international corporations. Hired to write songs for everything from "toilet seat covers to secret sauce", Cunningham continued to develop her abilities in composition while developing considerable production and arrangement skills in the process.

Her performances as a solo artist have taken her around the world, from Beijing to Cairo, as well as much of Europe and the U.S. with her band, JaeCie. Cunningham recorded 7 different albums (on almost as many record labels) both nationally and internationally. Described as a "happy collision between Sheryl Crow and Anastacia" by a Texan disc jockey, Jeanie's music embraces a wide variance of styles, with R&B and folk music being the backbone behind her sound.

In addition to her ongoing pursuits as a solo recording artist and "custom-songwriter", Cunningham began developing a new TV show called The Composers' Corner in 2003, dedicated to "interviewing musicians by musicians, exploring new gadgets and techniques, dissecting songs, and giving the viewer a window into the world of music creation". In 2007, The Composers Corner moved to the internet with its own website dedicated to the education of music to those who are interested in pursuing it as a career.

In 2007, after a six-year dedicated effort, Cunningham completed 23 compositions for her first musical, DULA (from the play written by Paul Elliott), which gives a detailed and dramatic history of the folk-song legend Tom Dooley, presenting him as an innocent man who was hung for a crime he did not commit in the years immediately following the Civil War. Its first staged reading was performed at Northwestern University in 2012 and the world premiere of the full production took place at the Oh Look! Performing Arts Center near Dallas, Texas in 2015.

She has been seen performing at the Sommet Center in Nashville (2007) and the New Orleans Morial Convention Center (2008) with Shaklee Corporation CEO, Roger Barnett, himself a gifted pianist and composer. The two of them penned a song for the Shaklee Company, "You Can Have It All" which they recorded together in Hollywood's famous Cherokee Studios. That recording was the last recording ever made at Cherokee before it closed its doors after over 40 years. (Music Connection Article).

In October 2015, Cunningham performed at the International Expo in Milan, Italy on behalf of her alma mater, the American School in Switzerland. She continues to remain active both as a performer and a teacher of "music composition with lyrical compatibility" and ukuleles to both school children and teachers. She and co-author Elisabeth Thormodsrud are published by Musikk-Husets Forlag A/S for their Norwegian Ukulele instruction textbook Gøy Med Ukulele i Klasserommet.

Personal life

In 1973, Jeanie's adoptive mother, Joan Cunningham died of cirrhosis of the liver. Her adoptive father, Ralph Cunningham, remarried within 6 months of Joan's death, and by the end of that year, Jeanie and her brother Caleb were no longer living in his and his new wife's home. Jeanie later struck out on a personal quest to locate her biological family and discover her roots.

In 1995, Cunningham located her biological parents. Her mother was Gladys Jane Swift, one of the earliest female TV news anchors in the country; Cunningham's father, David Gilmore Baldwin III, was a former World War II aviation hero, having twice won the Distinguished Flying Cross Award. He later went on to become a newspaper journalist, then a speechwriter for the American Medical Association and various politicians.

Baldwin and Swift met while he was the Deputy Press Secretary for then Governor George Leader of Pennsylvania. Swift was the local news anchor for the Tri-Stateted States region. The two fell in love but David was still married although separated from his wife at the time. According to Baldwin, both he and Swift resisted intimacy due to his unresolved marital status, but on New Year's Eve 1955-56, the two celebrated the New Year with a one-time union that would produce a baby girl exactly nine months later. Unfortunately, the unexpected pregnancy took its toll on their relationship, and the potential for scandal forced Swift to leave her life in Pennsylvania behind. Determined to keep the pregnancy secret, she and her mother took a train cross-country to Los Angeles where the two of them waited out the pregnancy. Gladys gave birth to Susan Swift on September 3, 1956 and put her up for adoption. Susan was later renamed Jean Akin Cunningham by her new adoptive parents 3 weeks later.

Shortly after Susan and her mother headed to the West Coast, Baldwin returned to his wife Tite and the two of them together would raise their 2 sons, Geoff and Brooks, and ultimately celebrate their 50th anniversary before Baldwin died in 1997. From the first reunion and in spite of the prior history, Cunningham and Tite became very close friends, while Cunningham and her two half-brothers forged a new bond of sibling devotion. All three shared music and theatre in common, with Brooks being a graduate of Juilliard, and Geoff being a recording artist.

While the reunion between father and daughter proved to be joyous, there was no such reunion between Cunningham and Swift. Cunningham did manage to contact Swift, but Swift wanted no part in the relationship and refused to see her. She later died in 2001, but not without informing her only son Peter (by her marriage to George Seibert who had died a number of years earlier), that he had a half sister named Jeanie. Leaving it at that, she kept the pictures and letter Cunningham sent in her desk where Peter was able to locate them after she died, and he ended up contacting Cunningham.

The two of them met in Maryland and spent a week together on the Chesapeake Bay getting to know one another, clarifying all that had happened, and even meeting with former Governor George Leader, sharing in the news. Peter and Cunningham also formed a close relationship and, in spite of the addition of three more brothers, Cunningham still remains very close to her "original brother", Caleb and his family.

Since 1994 she has also been the mentor, "tormentor" as she politely puts it, to four young men by the names of Peter, Pablo, Bryan, and Jonathan who are among what Cunningham considers to be "the greatest treasures" in her life. Helping them grow from "tweens" to "adults", she takes pride in their accomplishments and has been a vocal proponent to the cause of mentoring youth.
A licensed pilot, Cunningham flies the skies herself in fixed-wing single-engine aircraft, as well as logging time in helicopters such as the Hughes 300 and the Bell Jetranger 206B. On the ground she enjoys golfing, hiking, bicycling and spending time with her longtime life companion (since 1981), and now, legal wife (since 2013), Margaret, step-daughter Mia, and grandson, Rodney.

Discography

Albums with band 
Up for Grabs with the JaeCie Band.
Between the Lines (1996)
Thief in the Night(1998)

Singles 
Thief in the Night (1998)
Reason-4-Livin (1997)
Rose to #4 on the OutVoice Top 40 Chart (National Gay and Lesbian Charts).
We will remember - Aruba's tribute to America (2002)

Solo albums 
Point of you (1981)
CAYA - Come as you are to the Father (1999)
2000 Gay & Lesbian American Music Awards (GLAMA) nominee
Phoenix Rising (2006)

Musicals 
Dula the Musical (2006)
The Academy of New Musical Theatre announces winners
The Alliance of Los Angeles Playwrights

Literary Work 
Los Diggities (2015) A book series about rescued dogs.
Los Diggities

References

External links 
 

Living people
American Christians
Record producers from Los Angeles
American women singer-songwriters
Writers from Los Angeles
1956 births
Singers from Los Angeles
LGBT Christians
American LGBT singers
American women record producers
American adoptees
Singer-songwriters from California
21st-century American women